The Sikh Youth Symposium is an annual public speaking and debate competition held for the Sikh youth across the United States of America and Canada, encouraging them to reconnect with their cultural foundations and religious roots. Organized by the Sikh Youth Alliance of North America (SYANA), the competition is open to children between the ages of 6 and 22 and has three levels--locals, regionals, and internationals. The children are divided into five groups, on the basis of age, with the first four groups competing by way of prepared speeches and the final group engaging in a stimulating discussion focused on a yearly chosen topic. The competition aims to ensure that the next generation of Sikh leaders remains firmly connected to the basic principles of its religion.

Format
The competition is divided into five age groups: Group I (6-8 years old), Group II (9-10 years old), Group III (11-13 years old), Group IV (14-17 years old, and Group V (16-22 years old). Each age group is assigned a different book on the Sikh religion each year by a committee of regional and international conveners. This committee also generates a list of three questions for each age group that are to be answered in the participants' speeches. The answers to these questions can be found, in large part, in the book assigned; however, some reflection and critical thinking by the participants is necessary in answering the questions, as well. 

The local level of the competition is usually held within a gurdwara. The winners in each group of the competition advance to the regional level, which usually involves four to five gurdwaras in close geographical proximity. The winners in each group of this competition advance to the international level, which is hosted in a different city across the United States of America and Canada every year.

At the local, regional, and international level for groups I - IV, the competition is held in the form of a prepared speech. Group I's allotted time is 5 minutes, Group II's allotted time is 6 minutes, Group III's allotted time is 6 minutes, and Group IV's allotted time is 7 minutes. A panel of three judges assesses the speeches, weighing 60% of a participant's score on his/her content (answering the questions) and the remaining 40% on the participant's presentation (style and delivery, eye contact, voice and diction, language, and overall effectiveness). For Group V, the local and regional competition is usually a prepared speech, graded in the same manner as groups I-IV. However, the international competition for Group V is a debate between the winners from each region. The debate consists of four phases--opening statements, questions from the moderator, closing statements, and questions from the sangat--and typically lasts three hours. 

Whereas the local and regional competition are completed in a day in April/May, the international competition spans the entire first weekend of August. Finalists and their families arrive in the host city on a Thursday, checking in that evening and receiving their informational packets for the weekend. Also on Thursday evening, the regional and international conveners meet to decide on the books and international host city for the next year. On Friday morning, the competition for Group I, Group II, and Group III is typically held before langar and Group IV's competition is held after langar. On Friday evening, participants and their families enjoy a social activity, ranging from a tour of the city and its notable landmarks to a fun activity, such as bowling or attending a rodeo. On Saturday, the marquee event of the Symposium--the Group V debate--is held throughout the morning and early afternoon. In the evening, participants and their families enjoy a formal banquet to honor the Symposium's participants. On Sunday morning, the awards ceremony is held and, after langar, the Symposium is officially complete.

List of Past International Symposiums

2002
Detroit, Michigan

2003
Toronto, Ontario

2004
Atlanta, Georgia

2005
Boston, Massachusetts

2006
Seattle, Washington

2007
Bakersfield, California

2008
Dallas, Texas (Akaljot Gurdwara and Sikh Temple of North Texas)

2009
Detroit, Michigan (Singh Sabha of Michigan and Madison Heights Gurdwara)

Books

2010
Toronto, Ontario

Winners

2011
Seattle, Washington

Books

Winners

2012

Books
Group I: Warrior Princess I by Harjit Singh Lakhan

Group II: Warrior Princess II by Harjit Singh Lakhan

Group III: Khalsa Generals by Dr. Gurbakhsh Singh

Group IV: Martyrs - The Pride of Sikhs by Sikh Missionary College, Ludhiana

Group V: Panth Dardiyo Kuchh Karo by Sikh Missionary College, Ludhiana

Winners

2013
SEWA gurudwara Atlanta, Georgia

Books
Group I: Supreme Sacrifices of Young Souls by Jagdish Singh

Group II: Why Am I A Sikh? by Sikh Missionary College, Ludhiana

Group III: Sikh Way of Life by Sikh Missionary College, Ludhiana

Group IV: Brief History of Sikh Misls by Sikh Missionary College, Ludhiana

Group V: The Message of Gurbani (Chapters on Anand Sahib, Asa Ki Var, and 'Who is God') by Dr. Gurbaksh Singh

Winners

2014
Cleveland, Ohio

Books
Group I: The Illustrated Story of Chamkaur Sahib: The Martyrdom of Elder Sahibzadas by S. Jagdish Singh

Group II: Selected Episodes from Sikh History - Vol I by Sikh Missionary College, Ludhiana

Group III: We Are Not Symbols by S. Harjot Singh

Group IV: Chithiyan Likh Satguraan Val Paiaan by S. Manohar Singh

Group V: 1984 Pogroms - 30 years

Winners

2015
Gurdwara Khalsa Prakash, Windsor, ON

Books
Group I: Basic Principles of SIkhism, Sikh Missionary College, Ludhiana

Group II: The Warrior Princess: Mata Bhaag Kaur, by S. Harmeet Singh

Group III: Brief History of the Sikh Gurus, Sikh Missionary College, Ludhiana

Group IV: Teaching Sikh Heritage to the Youth (Vol. 1), by Dr. Gurbaksh Singh

Group V: Sikhism: A Universal Message, by Dr. Gurbaksh Singh

Winners

2016
Gurdwara Pittsburgh, Monroeville, PA

Books
Group I: My Guru's Blessings Book 1, by S. Daljeet Singh, Gyan Khand Media

Group II: My Guru's Blessings Book 2, by S. Daljeet Singh, Gyan Khand Media

Group III: Teaching Sikh Heritage to the Youth (Vol. 2), by Dr. Gurbaksh Singh

Group III: Sahibey Kamaal Guru Gobind Singh, by Daulat Rai

Group V: Sidh Gosht, Sikh Missionary College, Ludhiana

Winners:

2017 
Gurdwara Nanak Darbar, Duncan, SC

Books
Group I: My Guru's Blessings Book 3, by S. Daljeet Singh, Gyan Khand Media

Group II: My Guru's Blessings Book 4, by S. Daljeet Singh, Gyan Khand Media

Group III: Khalsa Generals, by Dr. Gurbaksh Singh

Group IV: Baba Banda Singh Bahadur, Sikh Missionary College, Ludhiana

Group V: Asa Ki Vaar, Sikh Missionary College, Ludhiana

Winners

2018 
Khalsa Gurmat Center, Federal Way, WA

Books
Group I: Warrior Princess Rani Sahib Kaur, by S. Harmeet Singh

Group II: Why Am I a Sikh, Sikh Missionary College, Ludhiana

Group III: Selected Episodes from Sikh History - Part 3, Sikh Missionary College, Ludhiana

Group IV: Guru Granth Sahib: A Supreme Treasure, Dr. Sarup Singh

Group V: (Theme) Importance of Giving Gurgaddi to Guru Granth Sahib

Winners

External links 

 SYANA Sikh Youth Symposium website
 Video of Phase 2 and 3 of the 2010 Group V international debate in Toronto, Ontario
Sikh festivals
Religious festivals in the United States
Religious festivals in Canada